Tickanetley is an unincorporated community in Gilmer County, in the U.S. state of Georgia.

History
Tickanetley originally was the name of a Cherokee Indian village which stood at the present town site. A variant spelling is "Ticanetlee". A post office was established at Tickanetley in 1880, and remained in operation until 1914.

References

Unincorporated communities in Georgia (U.S. state)
Unincorporated communities in Gilmer County, Georgia